Richard Ainslie Kirchhoffer (June 28, 1890 – May 31, 1977) was seventh bishop of the Episcopal Diocese of Indianapolis, serving from 1939 to 1959.

Early life and education
Kirchhoffer was born in Souris, Manitoba, Canada on June 28, 1890, the son of Irish parents Richard Beresford Kirchhoffer and Mary Elizabeth Young. His grandfather and two great-grandfathers were clergymen in the Church of Ireland. He studied at the University of Southern California in Los Angeles and earned a Bachelor of Arts in 1913. He also studied at the General Theological Seminary and graduated with a Bachelor of Divinity in 1916. He was awarded a Doctor of Sacred Theology from General, and a Doctor of Divinity from the University of Southern California, in 1939.

Ordained Ministry
Kirchhoffer was ordained deacon for the Diocese of California in April 1916 by Bishop Charles Fiske of Central New York, and became assistant at All Saints' Church in Worcester, Massachusetts. He was then ordained priest on March 26, 1917 by Bishop Thomas Frederick Davies Jr. of Western Massachusetts in All Saints' Church. He married Arline Leicester Wagner on September 7, 1918, and together had three children. Between 1918 and 1919, he served as chaplain in the US Army, until he became rector of All Saints' Church in Riverside, California. In 1925, he became rector of Christ Church in Mobile, Alabama, where he remained till 1939.

Bishop
In 1938, Kirchhoffer was elected Coadjutor Bishop of Indianapolis and was consecrated on February 8, 1939 by Presiding Bishop Henry St. George Tucker. He succeeded as diocesan bishop five days later, on February 13, upon the death of Bishop Francis. Kirchhoffer remained in office till his retirement in 1959. After retirement he moved to Sonoma, California where he died on May 31, 1977.

References 

Diocesan website

1890 births
1977 deaths
General Theological Seminary alumni
University of Southern California alumni
20th-century American Episcopalians
Episcopal bishops of Indianapolis
20th-century American clergy